A list of banks in the Republic of Ireland:

Commercial banks
Allied Irish Banks
Bank of America Europe
Bank of Ireland
Bank of Montreal Europe
Barclays Bank Ireland
Citibank Europe
Dell Bank International
EBS
Elavon Financial Services
Hewlett-Packard International Bank
Intesa Sanpaolo Bank Ireland
KBC Bank Ireland
Macquarie Bank Europe
permanent tsb
Scotiabank (Ireland)
Ulster Bank Ireland
Wells Fargo Bank International

Defunct banks
ACC Bank
Anglo Irish Bank – in July 2011, merged with the Irish Nationwide Building Society, forming a new company named the Irish Bank Resolution Corporation, itself dissolved in February 2013 under special liquidation following its recapitalisation and directive of Minister for Finance under powers from Credit Institutions (Stabilisation) Act 2010.
Bank of Scotland (Ireland)
Danske Bank
First Active
ICS Building Society (previously Irish Civil Service Building Society) – investment shares acquired in 1984 by Governor and Company of the Bank of Ireland as well as society savers but ran separately for a period until a legislative change after the 1987 General Election. ICS Building Society then integrated into Bank of Ireland management including board appointees, albeit a separate brand and broker network was retained, existing loans etc. under ICS branding. ICS Building Society was bailed out in 2008 onwards due to the economic downturn. The brand, broker network and a performing book of mortgage loans with a value in the region of €223m was sold by Bank of Ireland in 2014 to Dilosk DAC after the European Commission ruled that, due to Irish mortgage market requirements placed on Bank of Ireland, it had to dispose of ICS in order to maintain competition.(https://www.rte.ie/news/business/2014/0901/640755-ics-building-dilosk/) The sale went ahead unusually, without apparent approval required of society savers and the building society in tandem, was wound up in time for the sale and transfer of its some of its loan book etc. (http://www.independent.ie/business/irish/ics-building-society-savers-have-been-shortchanged-30531376.html). It now trades as ICS Mortgages. (http://www.icsmortgages.ie/about) 
Irish Nationwide Building Society – part of IBRC, itself dissolved in February 2013 under special liquidation following its recapitalisation and directive of Minister for Finance under powers from Credit Institutions (Stabilisation) Act 2010.
Postbank Ireland

Building societies
None as of 8 March 2023.

List of credit institutions authorized to carry on banking business in the Republic of Ireland under Irish legislation.

Complete list as of 8 March 2023, information based on the official Credit Institutions Register on the Central Bank of Ireland homepage. 

In addition to these there are many European credit institutions authorised in another member state of the European Economic Area (EEA) and operating in the Republic of Ireland either on a branch or a cross-border basis.

Economy of the Republic of Ireland
Ireland
Lists of organisations based in the Republic of Ireland

Lists of companies of Ireland
Economy of Ireland-related lists
Ireland